The 1993–94 Michigan State Spartans men's basketball team represented Michigan State University in the 1993–94 NCAA Division I men's basketball season. The team played their home games at Breslin Center in East Lansing, Michigan and were members of the Big Ten Conference. They were coached by Jud Heathcote in his 18th year at Michigan State. The Spartans finished the season with a record of 20–12, 10–8 in Big Ten play to finish in fourth place. They received an at-large bid to the NCAA tournament as the No. 7 seed in the Southeast region. There they beat Seton Hall in the First Round before losing to second-seeded and eventual National Runner-Up Duke in the Second Round.

Previous season
The Spartans finished the 1992–93 season with a record of 15–13, 7–11 in Big Ten play to finish in eighth place. Michigan State received an at-large bid to the National Invitation Tournament. There they lost to Oklahoma in the first round.

Roster

Schedule and results

|-
!colspan=9 style=| Non-conference regular season

|-
!colspan=9 style=| Big Ten regular season

|-
!colspan=9 style=|NCAA tournament

Awards and honors
 Shawn Respert – All-Big Ten First Team

References

Michigan State Spartans men's basketball seasons
Michigan State
Michigan State
Michigan State Spartans men's b
Michigan State Spartans men's b